Kim Ji-yong (Hangul: 김지용) (born February 20, 1988, in Seoul) is a South Korean pitcher for the Doosan Bears of the KBO League.

References 

Doosan Bears players
KBO League pitchers
South Korean baseball players
1988 births
Living people